2 Willow Road is part of a terrace of three houses in Hampstead, London designed by architect Ernő Goldfinger and completed in 1939. It has been managed by the National Trust since 1995 and is open to the public. It was one of the first Modernist buildings acquired by the Trust, giving rise to some controversy. Goldfinger lived there with his wife Ursula and their children until his death in 1987.

History
1–3 Willow Road was constructed using concrete and a facing of red brick. A number of cottages were demolished to allow for the construction, which was strongly opposed by a number of local residents including novelist Ian Fleming (this was said to be his inspiration for the name of the James Bond villain Auric Goldfinger) and the future Conservative Home Secretary Henry Brooke. No. 2, which Goldfinger designed specifically as his own family home, is the largest of the three houses and features a spiral staircase designed by engineer Ove Arup at its core. The building is supported by a concrete frame, part of which is external, leaving room for a spacious uncluttered interior, perhaps inspired by the Raumplan ideas of modernist architect Adolf Loos.

Today
Goldfinger himself designed much of the furniture in No. 2, and the house also contains a significant collection of 20th-century art by Bridget Riley, Prunella Clough, Marcel Duchamp, Eduardo Paolozzi, Henry Moore and Max Ernst.

Nos. 1 and 3 remain private homes.

References

 Warburton, Nigel. Ernő Goldfinger: The Life of an Architect (Routledge, 2004) .
 Historic England building description

External links
 
 2 Willow Road information from the National Trust

Houses completed in 1938
Modernist architecture in London
Houses in Hampstead
Ernő Goldfinger buildings
Grade II* listed houses in London
National Trust properties in London
Historic house museums in London
Museums in the London Borough of Camden